The Grand Trunk Corporation is the subsidiary holding company for the Canadian National Railway's properties in the United States. It is named for CN subsidiary railroad Grand Trunk Western Railroad. The Association of American Railroads has considered it to be a Class I railroad since fiscal year 2002.

GTC was incorporated under Delaware General Corporation Law on September 21, 1970 as Grand Trunk Industries, Inc., and renamed Grand Trunk Corporation on November 18, 1970. It acquired control of CN's U.S. properties; Grand Trunk Western, Central Vermont Railway and the Duluth, Winnipeg and Pacific Railway in December 1971, and has since acquired other companies, mostly through acquisitions of other holding companies: Illinois Central Railroad (IC) in 1999, Wisconsin Central Transportation Corporation (WC) in 2001, Great Lakes Transportation in 2004, and Elgin, Joliet and Eastern Railway in 2008.

References

Further reading

External links

AAR Grand Trunk Corporation company profile

Canadian National Railway subsidiaries
United States railroad holding companies
Class I railroads in North America
Transport companies established in 1970